Kungens Kurva (literally, "The King's Bend" or "The King's Curve") is a part of Huddinge Municipality, in Metropolitan Stockholm, Sweden, 20 km south of the city. The area got its name on 28 September 1946, when King Gustav V's chauffeur-driven 1939 Cadillac skidded off the road and ended up in a ditch (The king was uninjured). The name later became official.

The area has a large retail park, with stores such as supermarkets, electronics/hardware retailers and the world's third largest IKEA store, with, since a 2014 expansion, a total area of 63,200 square meters. It is close to Skärholmen metro station, which provides access to Stockholm.

Sports
The following sports clubs are located in Kungens Kurva:

 Segeltorps IF

References

Metropolitan Stockholm